"Just Another Lonely Night" is a 1965 song co-written and co-produced by William "Mickey" Stevenson and Ivy Jo Hunter. It was recorded by four Motown acts: The Temptations, Brenda Holloway, The Four Tops, and The Fantastic Four.

The Temptations first recorded in 1965 for the Gordy (Motown) label. Their version would be released as an album track on The Temptin' Temptations. It features a lead by Paul Williams, one of the group's original lead singers who by then had been eclipsed by David Ruffin and Eddie Kendricks as lead even on the group's album tracks and A B-sides. Although Williams still recorded several leads, they were often overlooked for release by the label. Williams and the other Temptations constantly complained about not allowing Williams more leads on album tracks, and singles, but Motown paid them no heed. The Andantes were added for additional backing vocals on the track.

Brenda Holloway later covered the song in 1966, and the Four Tops in 1967; the Andantes backed both recordings. In the Tops' case, lead singer Levi Stubbs recorded his lead soon after the Tempts completed their version, and the group (with the Andantes) dubbed backing vocals over the Tempts/Andantes original instrumental and vocal backing track. Joining the Andantes as backing vocals on Holloway's version were the Originals, who were signed to label earlier that year.

Detroit-based R&B group The Fantastic Four covered it as a 1969 single on Motown's Soul label, with the Andantes brought in once again to provide additional backing vocals. The group was one of the acts (along with Edwin Starr, J. J. Barnes, etc.) whose contracts were bought by Motown when they purchased both the Ric-Tic and Golden World labels. At Ric-Tic, the group was the label's most successful act, outselling Starr and the other acts signed. However, success would not follow them to Motown and the single failed to chart. "Just Another Lonely Night" was the second track on The Fantastic Four's cancelled and unreleased Motown album How Sweet He Is.

Personnel

Temptations version 
 Lead vocals by Paul Williams
 Background vocals by Eddie Kendricks, Melvin Franklin, Paul Williams, David Ruffin, Otis Williams, and The Andantes (Jackie Hicks, Marlene Barrow, and Louvain Demps)
 Instrumentation by The Funk Brothers

Brenda Holloway version 
 Lead vocals by Brenda Holloway
 Background vocals by The Originals (Hank Dixon, C. P. Spencer, Walter Gaines, and Freddie Gorman) and The Andantes (Jackie Hicks, Marlene Barrow, and Louvain Demps)
 Instrumentation by The Funk Brothers

Four Tops version 
 Lead vocals by Levi Stubbs
 Background Vocals by Renaldo "Obie" Benson, Lawrence Payton, and Abdul "Duke" Fakir, The Temptations (Eddie Kendricks, Melvin Franklin, Paul Williams, David Ruffin, and Otis Williams) and The Andantes (Jackie Hicks, Marlene Barrow, and Louvain Demps)
 Instrumentation by The Funk Brothers

Fantastic Four  version 
 Lead vocals by James Epps
 Background Vocals by Ralph Pruitt, Joseph Pruitt, Wallace "Toby" Childs, and The Andantes (Jackie Hicks, Marlene Barrow, and Louvain Demps)
 Instrumentation by The Funk Brothers
Arranged by Paul Riser and Wade Marcus

References

1965 songs
1969 singles
The Temptations songs
Four Tops songs
Brenda Holloway songs
The Fantastic Four (band) songs
Songs written by William "Mickey" Stevenson
Songs written by Ivy Jo Hunter
Song recordings produced by William "Mickey" Stevenson
Song recordings produced by Ivy Jo Hunter